This is a list of Pakistan's women's international footballers – association football players who have played for the Pakistan women's national football team in officially recognised international matches. The women's national team is governed by the Pakistan Football Federation.

Key

International Footballers

Current Team 
The following players are members of the national team (as at 14 November 2016).

International Players

References 

Pakistan
 
Association football player non-biographical articles